Louis Joseph Berberet (November 20, 1929 – April 6, 2004) was an American catcher in Major League Baseball who played for the New York Yankees, Washington Senators, Boston Red Sox and Detroit Tigers between 1954 and 1960. He was born in Long Beach, California.

He retired after the 1960 season having a career batting average of .230, with 31 home runs, 153 runs batted in, and a fielding percentage of .992.

Berberet died on April 6, 2004.

References

External links

1929 births
2004 deaths
Baseball players from Long Beach, California
Binghamton Triplets players
Birmingham Barons players
Boston Red Sox players
Detroit Tigers players
Kansas City Blues (baseball) players
Major League Baseball catchers
New York Yankees players
Santa Clara University alumni
Toronto Maple Leafs (International League) players
Washington Senators (1901–1960) players